The Pražský Krysařík (Prague Ratter) is a small breed of dog from the Czech Republic that is rarely seen outside its country of origin. It is the smallest breed in the world by breed standard, because of the maximum height of the dogs, unlike Chihuahuas who are measured by weight.

Description

Appearance
Also known as the Pražský Krysařík, and often confused with the Chihuahua and the Miniature Pinscher, the Prague Ratter is a small toy dog. Ideal height is 20 cm to 23 cm, being 2 cm shorter in maximum height than the minimum height of the Miniature Pinscher. Adult weight is mostly between 1.5 kg to 3.5 kg. Generally the best weight is 2.6 kg.

There are two coat variations: 
 short: smooth, glossy and thick
 long: fringes on ears, limbs and tail

The most common color is black and tan, which is also the original color. Lately, other colors have been approved: brown and tan, blue and tan, lilac and tan, yellow, pink, red and merle.

Temperament
Best known for its active and lively nature, the Prague Ratter is a spunky breed that is full of original character. These tiny dogs thrive on strong and dependable relationships with humans, love to receive affection and play the role of lap dog during down time. This breed is highly intelligent and generally responds well to basic training and commands. As a pet, the Prague Ratter is obedient, loyal, loving, and very affectionate. The Prague Ratter adapts well to full-time indoor and apartment living, yet still enjoys spending time outdoors, playing games such as fetch, and taking long and leisurely walks. They are also known to be a very quiet dog, unlike many other small dogs who tend to be very "yappy". Like any small dog, one should be wary of allowing them to develop Small Dog Syndrome, as they can become aggressive if they are not well-socialized from an early age.

Train-ability
Due to its need for human attention and eagerness to please and impress its owner, the Prague Ratter generally responds well to basic training and commands. This bright breed has the ability to learn to perform many impressive tricks and tasks. Many owners claim that these dogs can easily be taught to use a litter box, thus eliminating the need for constant trips outdoors.

Establishing immediate trust and respect is key to successfully training the Prague Ratter. These dogs can be somewhat sensitive to criticism and respond best to positive reinforcement and reward-based training.

Areas of use
Prazsky Krysarik might be small, but is nevertheless an easy dog to train as long as it is treated consistently. It can be trained for agility, freestyle, obedience, tracking etc.

The sense of smell and hearing is highly developed, and Prazsky Krysarik is still a great rat hunter, just as its original purpose was. They have a high prey drive and will readily go after squirrels, rats, and mice.

History

Czech dog breeders claim that krysariks are one of the oldest Czech breeds. The first mentions of these ratter dogs are found in the writings of the historian Einhard, dating back to the 8th-9th centuries. The Polish historian Gallus Anonymus mentions the beloved ratters of King Bolesław II the Generous (1058–1081). He became fond of the ratter and had two of them imported to Poland from Bohemia.  As their name suggests they were also commonly used as rat catchers in rural and urban households. Ratters are even mentioned in the writings of Jules Michelet: Charles IV of Luxembourg, during his visit to France in 1377, presented three ratters to King Charles V of France as a precious gift, and later they were inherited by his son the Dauphin. In historical chronicles and literary works, krysariks (ratters) are mentioned in connection with Wenceslas IV, Rudolf II and other European rulers.

In the era of the absence of cats in Europe, tiny Prague ratters, along with other rat-catchers, served to protect the property of the royal owners from rodents. Legends say that in the royal houses  krysariks were also obliged to protect the owners from poisoners: during meals they were allowed to walk on tables and taste food and drinks. With the decline of the Czech state, krysariks lost their exclusive belonging to the noble houses. They could be seen in peasant and bourgeois dwellings and outbuildings. They were used in rat battles popular in Europe. And over time they took their deserved place in the salons of ladies, as pets and companions.

The popularity of the Prague Ratter started to decline in the 19th century when the Miniature Pinscher became more fashionable. The breed went through a renaissance in the 1980s as Czechs and Slovaks started to breed them again. The first stage of the revival of the breed and the compilation of stud books began at the end of the 19th century under the leadership of dog breeders T. Rotter and O. Karlik. Two World Wars and the period of the communist regime on the territory of the Czech Republic nullified the results of their efforts, the stud books were lost. 

Modern Prague krysariks trace their history since the 70s of the XX century, the key role in the revival of the breed was played by the canine scientists Jan Findejs, Rudolf Šiler, (1909-1997). In 1980, the first Prague Ratter was registered in the studbook.

Until the end of the 20th century, the breed existed and developed exclusively within the borders of the Czech Republic and Slovakia. By the second decade of the 21st century, several hundred Prague krysariks live outside the Czech Republic. Breed clubs have been established in several countries. In addition to the countries of Western Europe and Scandinavia, Prague ratters live in Russia, USA and Japan. There is a small number of ratters in Ukraine, Kazakhstan and Italy.

In 2019, it became an FCI acknowledged breed. There are only about 6,000 Prague Ratters registered in the world and they usually only have 1-3 puppies per year. They are nevertheless presented at shows in the Czech Republic, Slovakia, and Scandinavia.

Health
It is believed that the Prague Ratter is one of the dog breeds that do not have significant health problems. However, they can be prone to:

 Diseases of the teeth and gums. Prague ratters are prone to increased formation of tartar, which leads to bad breath, as well as the development of periodontitis. Prevention consists of regularly brushing teeth and removing plaque when visiting your veterinarian. Krysariks can also have retained baby teeth, which may need to be pulled to prevent further problems with dentition.
 Bone injuries due to their small size. The most common fractures are the bones of the metacarpus and forearm.
 Patellar luxation, an ailment common to small breeds. It is believed that this defect is congenital and inherited.

Life expectancy
The Prazsky Krysarik has a life span of 12 to 14 years.

See also
 Dogs portal
 List of dog breeds

References

External links

 prazsky-krysarik.cz

FCI breeds
Dog breeds originating in the Czech Republic
Toy dogs
Companion dogs
Rare dog breeds